Beauty and the Beast is a 2009 Australian fantasy film directed by David Lister and starring Estella Warren, Rhett Giles, and Victor Parascos, and loosely based upon the fairy tale of the same name. The film was released in 2009 on video under that title and aired in 2010 on Syfy television as Beauty and the Beasts: A Dark Tale.

Plot
A series of horrific murders has the Beast being blamed for the crimes. Belle (Estella Warren) and Beast (Victor Parascos) must work together to investigate the crimes and discover who the true murderer is and why they're committing these murders.

Cast
 Estella Warren as Belle
 Rhett Giles as Count Rudolph
 Victor Parascos as The Beast
 Vanessa Gray as Lady Helen
 Peter Cook as Duke Edward 
 Nicholas G. Cooper as Duke Henry 
 Gabriella Di Labio as Anna 
 Tony Bellette as Otto 
 Damien Garvey as Dr. Thorne 
 Anthony Kidd as Kurt 
 Todd Levi as Baron Conrad  
 Tony Thurbon as King Maxililian 
 Alex Kuzelicki as Troll

Production
The project was filmed in Australia at locations on the Gold Coast and at studios at the Village Roadshow Studios adjacent to Warner Bros. Movie World in Queensland.

Reception
Variety reviewed the film and offered that it was "an odd, bloody, cheaply made" adaptation "designed not for kids, but young guys heading toward a date with a Sunday-morning hangover." Toward the film as a "re-imagining" of the beloved Beauty and the Beast, they offered that Disney Studios "needn't lose any sleep." Other critical reception for the film was negative, with The Trades writing "Shun this ugly duckling, and hope that the future plans for other retellings from SyFy learn from this one's mistakes." Dread Central panned the film, criticizing the chemistry between Estella Warren and Victor Parascos, stating "Xena and her female sidekick Gabrielle shared more sexual chemistry than these two." New Zealand-based review site Mori.co.nz praised Rhett Giles' acting but criticized the film as a whole. Tor.com reviewed the film, saying "SyFy seems to have given this venture the same short shrift it’s given all its other movies, and their premiere effort ends up simply [beast-related pun]".<ref name=Tor.com>{{cite web|last=Valentine|first=Genevieve|title=review: Beauty and the Beast|url=http://www.tor.com/blogs/2010/03/syfys-lemgbeauty-and-the-beastlemg|date=1 March 2010|publisher=Tor.com|accessdate=22 March 2012}}</ref> Filmink negatively reviewed Beauty and the Beast, calling it "a spectacular calamity that genuinely has no saving graces whatsoever."

Conversely, Monsters & Critics praised the film "for all its camp, overwrought acting, diabolical machinations and just plain old silly B-movie fun" and concluded their review by writing, "Given all the horrible, sad news going on in the world especially today, Beauty'' is just what the doctor ordered for a short respite from the misery."

References

External links
 
 

Syfy original films
Films set in the Middle Ages
2009 films
2000s English-language films
Films based on Beauty and the Beast
Films shot at Village Roadshow Studios
Films directed by David Lister
2000s American films